Tolley is a British publishing company that publishes reference books on tax.

History 
The company was established in 1916 by Charles H. Tolley.

In the 1970s Tolley was part of the Benn Group of companies. The Benn companies were taken over by the Extel Group in June 1983, which itself was taken over by United Newspapers in 1987. In 1996 the company was acquired by the publisher Butterworths, part of the Reed Elsevier group of companies, which now exists as LexisNexis UK but continues to publish under the Butterworths imprint.

Products 
 Tolley's Tax Guide, a full UK tax reference
 Tolley Guidance and Tolley Library (online) - UK tax legislation and tax cases

See also 
 Taxation in the United Kingdom

References

External links 
 Tolley
 LexisNexis

Accounting educators
Companies based in the City of London
Finance books
Publishing companies of the United Kingdom
Reference publishers
Taxation in the United Kingdom